Jon Land is an American author of thriller novels.

His books include the Caitlin Strong novels about a fifth-generation Texas ranger, and the Ben Kamal and Danielle Barnea books, about a Palestinian detective and chief inspector of the Israeli police.

He is an emeritus board member and currently sits on the marketing committee for the International Thriller Writers.

He was a screenwriter for the film Dirty Deeds.

Books

Caitlin Strong
Strong Enough to Die, Forge Books, 2009 
Strong Justice, Forge Books, 2010 
Strong at the Break, Forge Books, 2011 
Strong Vengeance, Forge Books, 2012
Strong Rain Falling, Forge Books, 2013 
Strong Darkness, Forge Books, 2014
Strong Light of Day, Forge Books, 2015
Strong Cold Dead, Forge Books, 2016
Strong to the Bone, Forge Books, 2017
Strong as Steel, Forge Books, 2019
Strong from the Heart, Forge Books, 2020

Ben Kamal and Danielle Barnea
The Walls of Jericho, Forge Books, 1997 
The Pillars of Solomon, Forge Books, 1999 
A Walk in the Darkness, Forge Books, 2000 
Keepers of the Gate, Forge Books, 2001 
Blood Diamonds, Forge Books, 2002 
The Blue Widows, Forge Books, 2003 
The Last Prophecy, Forge Books, 2004

Blaine McCracken
The Omega Command, Fawcett, 1986
The Alpha Deception, Fawcett, 1987  
The Gamma Option, Fawcett, 1989 
The Omicron Legion, Fawcett, 1991 
The Vengeance of the Tau, Fawcett, 1993 
Day of the Delphi, Tor Books, 1993 
Kingdom of the Seven, Forge Books, 1994 
The Fires of Midnight, Forge Books, 1996
Dead Simple, Forge Books, 1998 
Pandora's Temple, Open Road Media, 2012 
The Tenth Circle, Open Road Media, 2013

Jared Kimberlain
The Eighth Trumpet, Fawcett, 1989 
The Ninth Dominion, Fawcett, 1991

Michael Tiranno 
The Seven Sins: The Tyrant Ascending, Forge Books, 2008 
Black Scorpion the Tyrant Reborn, Forge Books, 2015

Murder, She Wrote
Murder She Wrote - A Date with Murder, co-written with Donald Bain, Berkley, 2018
Murder, She Wrote - Manuscript for Murder, Berkley, November 2018
Murder, She Wrote - Murder in Red, Berkley, 2019
 Murder, She Wrote: A Time for Murder, Berkley, November 2019 
 Murder, She Wrote: The Murder of Twelve, Berkley, May 2020 
 Murder, She Wrote: Murder in Season, Berkley, November 2020

The Rising 
Written with Heather Graham

 The Rising, 2017
 Blood Moon, Tor Books, 2022

Other Fiction
The Doomsday Spiral, Zebra, 1983
Vortex, Zebra, 1984
The Lucifer Directive, Zebra, 1984
Labyrinth, Fawcett, 1985
The Council of Ten, Fawcett, 1987  
The Valhalla Testament, Fawcett, 1990
Hope Mountain, Forge Books, 1998
Dolphin Key, Forge Books, 1999
Dark Light: Dawn, Forge Books, 2017
Margaret Truman's Murder on the Metro, Forge Books, 2021

Nonfiction 

Betrayal: Whitey Bulger and the FBI Agent Who Fought to Bring Him Down, co-written with Robert Fitzpatrick, Forge Books, 2012
Takedown: A Small-Town Cop's Battle Against the Hells Angels and the Nation's Biggest Drug Gang, with Jeff Buck and Lindsay Preston, Forge Books, 2016

References

External links
Jon Land's official website
Modern Signed Books BlogTalkRadio Interview with Rodger Nichols November 2015
Modern Signed Books BlogTalkRadio Interview about Takedown with Rodger Nichols April 2016

Year of birth missing (living people)
Place of birth missing (living people)
Living people
American male novelists
American thriller writers
20th-century American novelists
21st-century American novelists
20th-century American male writers
21st-century American male writers